The Pardini GT9 is a semi-automatic pistol chambered in 9×21mm or 9×19mm Parabellum, depending on the market. It is manufactured by Pardini Arms in Italy, a company founded by former competition shooter Giampiero Pardini and that exclusively manufactures sporting arms.

Design
The GT9 is a pure competition pistol with adjustable single-action push mechanism, relatively high weight and with a low bore axis. It is chambered for the 9×19mm Parabellum cartridge, or alternately the 9×21mm cartridge in markets where civilian use of the 9×19mm is restricted, such as Italy. Magazine capacity is 17 rounds with flush-fitting magazines, and 19 rounds with extended magazines.

The GT pistols all have a 115-degree grip angle and a high grip for straight-back recoiling (minimal muzzle rise). Each pistol comes with two magazines, extra recoil spring, tool bag, owners manual, and a hard protective case. Color is silver (chromium slide) or black (burnished slide).

Variants
The GT40 is chambered in .40 S&W and comes with a factory-installed magwell and extended magazines with a capacity of 17 rounds. The GT45 is chambered in .45 ACP with flush-fitting magazines with a capacity of 13 rounds. Pardini also offers conversion kits for the GT45, enabling it to chamber 9mm or .40 S&W cartridges. These kits include a slide, barrel, recoil spring, recoil spring guide, and two magazines.

"Long slide" versions are also available. The GT9-1 and GT45 II have  barrels, compared to the  barrels of the GT9, GT40 and GT45. There is no long slide version of the GT40.

References

Further reading

External links
 GT Responsive Parts Diagram at pardiniguns.com
 Pardini GT9 5" Silver Unboxing & Overview via YouTube
 Pardini GT45 firing 45ACP and GT9 mm with a conversion slide via YouTube

Semi-automatic pistols of Italy
9mm Parabellum semi-automatic pistols
9×21mm IMI semi-automatic pistols
Pardini Arms